The New Galilee may refer to:

The New Galilee (Sixth Epoch), in the Western Wisdom Teachings
The New Galilee, Pennsylvania, a borough in Beaver County, Pennsylvania, United States